Justin Martin (born April 20, 1979) is an American DJ and record producer, based in San Francisco.

Career 
The first release on Dirtybird was The Southern Draw EP by Justin Martin and Sammy D. 

Martin released his sophomore album on April 20, 2016, via Dirtybird Records.

In 2020, Martin launched his own label, What To Do…, with the single “Needs.”

Discography

Charted albums

References 

1979 births
Living people
People from San Francisco
Place of birth missing (living people)
American DJs
DJs from San Francisco
American electronic musicians
Electronic dance music DJs